Organic may refer to:
 Organic, of or relating to an organism, a living entity
 Organic, of or relating to an anatomical organ

Chemistry
 Organic matter, matter that has come from a once-living organism, is capable of decay or is the product of decay, or is composed of organic compounds
 Organic compound, a compound that contains carbon
 Organic chemistry, chemistry involving organic compounds

Farming, certification and products
 Organic farming, agriculture conducted according to certain standards, especially the use of stated methods of fertilization and pest control
 Organic certification, accreditation process for producers of organically-farmed products
 Organic horticulture, the science and art of growing fruits, vegetables, flowers, or ornamental plants by following the essential principles of organic agriculture
 Organic products, "organics":
 Organic food, food produced from organic farming methods and often certified organic according to organic farming standards
 Organic clothing, clothing produced from organic fibers such as organic cotton
 Organic wine
 Organic movement, movement of organizations and individuals promoting organic farming and organic food

Computing
 Wetware computer or organic computer, a computer built from living neurons and ganglions
 Organic computing, computing systems with properties of self-configuration, self-optimization, self-healing, and/or self-protection
 Organic search, search results through unpaid search engine listings, rather than through paid advertisements
 Organic search engine, search engine which uses a combination of human operators and computer algorithms
 Organic semiconductor, an organic compound that exhibits similar properties to inorganic semiconductors

Economics and business
 Organic growth, business expansion through increasing output and sales as opposed to mergers, acquisitions and takeovers
 Organic, Inc., original digital marketing & advertising agency
 Organic organisation, one which is flexible and has a flat structure
 Organic Records, formerly a sub-label of Pamplin Music, now owned by Crossroads Entertainment & Marketing

Law
 Organic law, a fundamental law
 Organic statute, literally "regulations for an organ", with "organ" meaning an organization or governmental body
 Organic Articles, a French law presented in 1802

Music
 Organic (Arj Barker album), 2019
 Organic (Freak Kitchen album), 2005
 Organic (Joe Cocker album), 1996
 Organic-Lee, a 2006 album by Lee Konitz and Gary Versace

Other uses
 Organic (military), a military unit that is a permanent part of a larger unit and (usually) provides some specialized capability to that parent unit
 Organic (model), forms, methods and patterns found in living systems, often used as a metaphor for non-living things
 Organic disease, involving or affecting physiology or bodily organs
 Organic process
 Organic Realism, or process philosophy
 Organic architecture

See also
 Organic salt (disambiguation)
 Organicism, the biological doctrine which stresses the organization, rather than the composition, of organisms
 Organix (disambiguation)